Circle of Violence: A Family Drama (also known as Circle of Violence: A Family on the Edge or simply Circle of Violence) is a 1986 CBS television movie.  Directed by David Greene and starring Tuesday Weld, Geraldine Fitzgerald, Peter Bonerz and River Phoenix, the film  tells the tragic story of the seldom addressed issue of elder parent abuse.

Synopsis
Georgia Benfield is at a difficult place in her life; her husband, Pete, has left her for a younger woman, her teenage son, Chris, is unmanageable, and she's struggling financially when her widowed mother, Charlotte, moves in.  Amid juggling a new full-time job, raising two children, and her failing marriage, the constant bickering between mother and daughter continues as it has ever since Georgia was a child.

Finally, at her wit's end, Georgia loses control and begins physically abusing her elderly mother, just as Georgia had been abused herself as a child.  As family and friends slowly begin to learn of the abuse, and long buried family secrets come to light, both mother and daughter must learn to accept the past, to change what is happening at present, in order to face a better future.

Cast
 Tuesday Weld as Georgia Benfield
 Geraldine Fitzgerald as Charlotte Kessling
 Peter Bonerz as Pete Benfield
 River Phoenix as Chris Benfield
 Philip Sterling as Jim McLane
 Zoaunne LeRoy as Florence McLane
 Ellen Travolta as Marion
 Sue Giosa as Dr. Kalmeir
 Christina Maria Hutter as Addie Benfield
 Bradley Lieberman as Mark
 Jeanette Miller as Woman Singer
 Adele Gilbert as Mrs. Edwards

Awards

References

External links

1986 television films
1986 films
1986 crime drama films
American crime drama films
CBS network films
Films about domestic violence
Films directed by David Greene
Films scored by Gil Mellé
American drama television films
1980s English-language films
1980s American films